is a 1986 shoujo historical fantasy manga composed of three volumes written by Kaoru Kurimoto, a science fiction author best known for Guin Saga, and illustrated by Yumiko Igarashi, best known for Candy Candy. The plot of The Sword of Paros is also strongly centred on the romance of the protagonists, one of whom, like Oscar in The Rose of Versailles, is trying to pass as a man.

Plot

Far away and long ago in the kingdom of Paros, legend says that one can wield the sacred sword of the true ruler of Paros. According to this legend, in time of war, a single person will come forward, who can brandish this weapon and lead the country towards the future.  This prophecy also asserts that the true ruler, who will carry Paros to a future of light and prosperity, is neither man nor woman, while the one who will wield the sword wrongfully, and so destroy Paros forever, is neither man nor woman.

Unfortunately, in the kingdom of Paros, war is in the air: the neighbouring realm of Kauros wants in fact to conquer - through diplomacy, or through open war - the prosperous Kingdom of the Sword.  
The King of Paros, unfortunately, does not have a male heir, but only the Princess Erminia, who has grown up as if she were a boy.

All the kingdom speaks about Princess Erminia, for her brave and rebellious character, let alone for her force of mind.  However all know that she cannot reign because only men are permitted to rule and therefore it will be her husband who will be the future king regnant. Erminia's father orders her to take a husband, so that she will not have to marry the Prince of Kauros, and so allow Paros to be absorbed into Kauros.

Erminia does not intend to obey her father's wishes.  She tells her true friend, Yurias, that she feels that she is caught in a woman's body, possessing the mind of a man. Yurias is secretly in love with Erminia.

Fiona is one simple laundry maid of the castle of Paros, with a kind heart. However, she lives a life of uneasiness and suffering because of her poverty. When she was little, Fiona met in a barn a young prince who took care of her for a night.  From then on, Fiona has lived her life hoping to see her prince again.

Because of a fortuitous series of events, Erminia one day saves Fiona from a wild horse.   From then on, the two girls begin to fall in love.  Erminia tells Fiona of how trapping she finds being a princess, and how she feels about being born in the body of a woman.   Fiona then tells Erminia of her young prince, and Erminia realises that she was Fiona's young prince.  She is elated that Fiona sees her as being her prince, and Erminia kisses Fiona.  They dance, kiss and exchange promises on the night of the Carnival of Paros.

But the war between Kauros and Paros is imminent, and the king of Paros tries to force Erminia to marry.  Finding her shoulders to the wall again, Erminia decides to consent to the wish of her father, on the condition that her husband is chosen through a tournament. The last victor to this series of duels will have to defeat Erminia in battle in order to win her hand.  Her father begins to arrange the competition, confident that Yurias will win.

Whilst this is going on, Fiona has been abducted, raped, and left for dead.  As Erminia is cloistered, she does not know of Fiona's fate.

During the final duel, the knights of Paros are focussing their attention on the duel, allowing the knights of Kauros to sneak in, even as the traitor Prince Alfonse tosses her the Sword of Paros to use in the battle.  At this point, Erminia's father is assassinated, and Alfonse proclaims his death to be part of the legend of the Sword.  
The duel is stopped, and the Prince of Kauros is declared the victor.  
Taken captive by the guards of Kauros, Erminia is convinced that she has lost everything.  Fiona has vanished, Yurias has been defeated and half-blinded, her father is dead, and she will be forced to marry the Prince of Kauros.

Just when all seems to be at its worst, the peasants of the kingdom of Paros rebel against the Kauran soldiers.  Fiona is part of the group that intends to free Erminia, by having Fiona take Erminia's place.  Erminia cannot bear the thought of this, and so the two escape together on a horse provided by Yurias.

Characters
Princess Erminia - the princess of Paros, she considers herself to have been 'born with both a man's heart and a woman's heart'.  She has just come of age, but she does not want to marry and only find worth in bearing a prince for Paros.  She yearns for freedom and adventure.
Fiona - a sixteen-year-old laundry maid.  She lives in hope that she may find the prince of her childhood again.
Yurias - a nobleman raised with Erminia.  He loves her very much, but she sees him only as a brother.
Prince Alfonse - the half-brother to the King of Paros, his mother was from Kauros.  Uncle to Erminia.
Phaon - Third son of the King of Kauros. Prince Alfonse is trying to get Erminia to marry Phaon.

ISBN
Volume 1
Volume 2
Volume 3

Further reading

External links

1986 manga
Cross-dressing in anime and manga
Fantasy anime and manga
Kadokawa Shoten manga
Romance anime and manga
Shōjo manga
Yuri (genre) anime and manga